Kurt Liu (born 10 October 1978) is a Canadian table tennis player. He competed in the men's singles event at the 2000 Summer Olympics.

References

1978 births
Living people
Canadian male table tennis players
Olympic table tennis players of Canada
Table tennis players at the 2000 Summer Olympics
Place of birth missing (living people)